The sixth and final season of the American sitcom Superstore was ordered on February 11, 2020, and premiered the same year on NBC on October 29. Created by Justin Spitzer, the series continues to follow a group of employees working at Cloud 9, a fictional big-box store in St. Louis, Missouri. The ensemble and supporting cast features America Ferrera, Ben Feldman, Lauren Ash, Colton Dunn, Nico Santos, Nichole Sakura, Kaliko Kauahi, and Mark McKinney.

Production for the season began in September 2020 in the midst of the COVID-19 pandemic. As a test for Universal Television, it was decided that Superstore would create episodes set during the pandemic. In December 2020, it was announced by NBC that the season would serve as the show's last. After filming concluded in February 2021, it was revealed that Ferrera, who had left after the first two episodes, would return for the series finale.

For the first five episodes, the season aired on Thursdays at 8:00pm (Eastern), before airing at 8:30pm beginning with episode 6. The season featured the 100th episode of the series and concluded on March 25, 2021, with a one-hour series finale. "Essential", the season premiere, brought in 2.80 million viewers, while "All Sales Final", the series finale, was viewed by 2.41 million people. Overall, the season received positive reviews from critics, who praised the humor and conclusion of the series.

Cast

Main
 America Ferrera as Amy Sosa
 Ben Feldman as Jonah Simms
 Lauren Ash as Dina Fox
 Colton Dunn as Garrett McNeil
 Nico Santos as Mateo Fernando Aquino Liwanag
 Nichole Sakura as Cheyenne Thompson
 Kaliko Kauahi as Sandra Kaluiokalani
 Mark McKinney as Glenn Sturgis

Recurring
 Jon Barinholtz as Marcus White
 Kelly Schumann as Justine Sikowitz
 Amir M. Korangy as Sayid
 Irene White as Carol Maloon
 Steve Agee as Isaac
 Baron Vaughn as Ken
 Rory Scovel as Dr. Brian Patterson
 Maria Thayer as Hannah

Guest
Kelly Stables as Kelly Watson
Tony Plana as Ron Sosa
Marlene Forte as Connie Sosa
George Salazar as Eric Sosa
Michael Bunin as Jeff Sutton
Dave Foley as Lowell Anderson

Episodes

Production

Superstore was renewed for a sixth season on February 11, 2020, with the intention of airing during the 2020–21 United States network television schedule. On February 28, it was announced that series star America Ferrera would depart at the end of the fifth season citing new work opportunities. After production delays to the fifth season's final episode due to the COVID-19 pandemic, Ferrera's role was extended; she was included in the first two episodes of the sixth season to wrap up her character's storyline. In November, it was reported that Kelly Stables would return in the seventh episode to portray Jonah's ex-girlfriend Kelly. Prior to the episode's release, the plot for her return was kept under wraps. Production for the sixth season began in September 2020 with full safety protocols in place amid the pandemic.

During production, multiple showrunners, writers, and lead actors questioned whether it was the right choice to make a season about the COVID-19 pandemic. In March 2020, it was decided that the topic had to be mentioned due to the show's characters being essential workers, with Superstore serving as a "guinea pig" for Universal Television, producers of the series, to test the idea. This resulted in the creation of a "time jump" in the premiere episode set around various events during the pandemic. Furthermore, writers on the show decided to feature face masks as a key element for the season. However, this resulted in problems with "every single department" during production, causing producer Ben Feldman and actress Lauren Ash to have a session "to test every kind of mask". At one point, face shields were considered but were rejected due to reflections that appeared on cameras. After watching a rough cut of episode 4, writer Owen Ellickson said that the presence of masks felt "brutal" to watch onscreen.

After filming nine episodes by November 25, the show's crew was informed that the sixth season would be the last for Superstore, with the official announcement being released on December 3, 2020. After being in production for several months, the table read for the final episode occurred over Zoom on February 19, 2021, and filming concluded later in the week on February 28; the final scene shot for the series involved the main characters watching their job interviews, and the crew put together a compilation video of highlights and outtakes in lieu of a traditional wrap party. Soon after, NBC revealed that Superstore would conclude on March 25, 2021, with a one-hour series finale, and that Ferrera would return in the final episode. On the decision to bring Ferrera back to the series, Superstore creator Justin Spitzer told Deadline Hollywood that "It was the first question we asked ourselves. As soon as we were told that the show was ending, we called her [...] and she was immediately on board. It just felt the series finale would not have felt like the end without her. We knew we wanted her to come back to the end of this."

Release and reception

Broadcast
Following its renewal, on September 24, 2020, NBC announced that the sixth season of Superstore would begin airing on October 29, 2020, a change from its original scheduled October 22 premiere. Furthermore, its first five episodes aired on Thursdays at 8:00pm (Eastern), before airing at 8:30pm from the sixth episode on January 14, 2021.

Critical response
On review aggregator Rotten Tomatoes, the sixth season of Superstore holds an approval rating of 92% based on 12 reviews, with an average rating of 9.75/10. The website's critical consensus reads, "As funny and poignant as ever, Superstore closes up shop with a superb sixth season that solidifies its place as one of TVs greatest workplace comedies."

In Entertainment Weekly, Darren Franich said that the season premiere was "instant history with big laughs", as it covered major events that occurred during the COVID-19 pandemic in a humorous way, and called it "a high for the series." Writing for The Verge, Joshua Rivera also complimented the episode, and the start of the season, for being able to tackle the pandemic in a humorous way. From Slate, Rebecca Onion simply called the premiere a "time capsule of pandemic humor", while The Sydney Morning Herald Brad Newsome described the sixth season of Superstore as a "challenging comedy that's still clever enough to raise a chuckle".

Further reviews after the conclusion of the series with the airing of its one-hour finale were also positive. Ben Travers, from IndieWire, wrote that the series as a whole was not "short on ideas", comparing it the overall premise of The Office. Writing for The A.V. Club, Saloni Gajjar stated that the series finale was able to provide "sweet closure" along with "some hopeful happy endings for all its central characters". Lauding the season and the show as a whole for its characters, Kelly Lawler from USA Today said Superstore was unsuccessful in gaining popularity among shows such as Parks and Recreation and Community, writing that "We probably won't miss the store, but we'll miss its employees dearly." Vulture journalist Kovie Biakolo praised the series for its representation of the working class without reducing their characters to simply those traits, summarizing the season as being able to "exhibit a genuine picture of working-class life: wide-ranging, nuanced, and always meeting at a myriad of intersections."

Ratings

Notes

References

External links
 
 
 

Superstore (TV series)
2020 American television seasons
Television shows about the COVID-19 pandemic